Paolo Bertoli (1 February 1908 – 8 November 2001) was an Italian Roman Catholic Cardinal and Prefect of the Congregation for the Causes of Saints.

Early life
Paolo Bertoli was born in Poggio Garfagnana of  Italy. He was educated at the Seminary of Lucca and later at the Pontifical Roman Seminary in Rome where he earned doctorates in philosophy and theology. He carried on his studies at the Pontifical Roman Athenaeum "S. Apollinare", where he earned a doctorate in utroque iure (in both canon and civil law).

Priest

He was ordained on 15 August 1930 in Lucca. From 1930 until 1933 he studied further. From 1933 until 1938 he served as an attaché of the nunciature in Yugoslavia. He was created Privy chamberlain of His Holiness in 1934. He was an Auditor of the nunciature in France between 1938 and 1942. He was raised to the level of Domestic prelate of His Holiness in 1946. He was the Papal representative to the International Conference to solve the problems caused by the Second World War in Bern, Switzerland, in 1946. He was Chargé d'affaires of the nunciature in Czechoslovakia for 1949 but was unable to hold the post for political reasons.

Bishop

Pope Pius XII appointed him titular Archbishop of Nicomedia on 24 March 1952 and then named him apostolic delegate to Turkey two days later. He was consecrated a bishop on 11 May 1952 by Eugène Tisserant then Dean of the College of Cardinals. He was appointed Apostolic Nuncio to Colombia on 7 May 1953.

He was named Apostolic Nuncio to Lebanon on 16 April 1959 and Apostolic Nuncio to France on 16 April 1960. He attended the Second Vatican Council.

Cardinal

He was created Cardinal-Deacon of San Girolamo della Carità in the consistory of 28 April 1969. Pope Paul VI appointed him  Prefect of the Congregation for the Causes of Saints on 7 May 1969. He remained as Prefect until he resigned  on 1 March 1973. He was raised to the order of Cardinal-Priests and exchanged his deaconry for the title of S. Girolamo degli Schiavoni on 5 March 1973. He took part in the conclaves that elected Pope John Paul I and Pope John Paul II in August and October. Pope John Paul named him Camerlengo of the Holy Roman Church. He was elevated to the rank of Cardinal-Bishop of the suburbicarian see of Frascati on 30 June 1979. He resigned the post of Camerlengo on 25 March 1985. He died in 2001 in Rome.

References

20th-century Italian cardinals
Cardinal-bishops of Frascati
Participants in the Second Vatican Council
Apostolic Nuncios to Colombia
Apostolic Nuncios to France
Apostolic Nuncios to Lebanon
1908 births
2001 deaths
Pontifical Roman Seminary alumni
Members of the Congregation for the Causes of Saints
Camerlengos of the Holy Roman Church
Cardinals created by Pope Paul VI
20th-century Italian Roman Catholic bishops